Halina Maria Auderska (3 July 1904 – 21 February 2000) was a Polish screenwriter, writer and politician.

1904 births
2000 deaths
Home Army members
Polish children's writers
Polish women children's writers
Women members of the Sejm of the Republic of Poland
20th-century Polish screenwriters
20th-century Polish women
Polish women screenwriters